The Fort Collins – Loveland Metropolitan Statistical Area is a United States Office of Management and Budget (OMB) defined Metropolitan Statistical Area (MSA) located in the Fort Collins and Loveland area in the North Central region of the U.S. state of Colorado. The Fort Collins–Loveland MSA is defined as Larimer County, Colorado. The Census Bureau estimates that the population was 362,533 in 2021. The Fort Collins–Loveland MSA is the 150th most populous MSA in the United States.

Metropolitan area cities and towns

Unincorporated communities
Bellvue
Buckeye
Campion
Drake
Glen Haven
Livermore
Kinikinik
Manhattan 
Masonville
Old Roach 
Poudre Park
Rustic
Virginia Dale
Waverly

See also

Larimer County, Colorado
Colorado census statistical areas
Colorado metropolitan areas
Combined Statistical Area
Core Based Statistical Area
Micropolitan Statistical Area
Table of United States Combined Statistical Areas
Table of United States Metropolitan Statistical Areas
Table of United States Micropolitan Statistical Areas
Table of United States primary census statistical areas
Larger urban regions that contain the Fort Collins–Loveland Metropolitan Statistical Area:
Front Range Urban Corridor
North Central Colorado Urban Area
Census statistical areas adjacent to Fort Collins–Loveland Metropolitan Statistical Area:
North Central Colorado Urban Area
Boulder Metropolitan Statistical Area
Greeley Metropolitan Statistical Area
Cheyenne metropolitan area

References

Metropolitan areas of Colorado